The 2013 United Bowl was the fifth title game of the Indoor Football League (IFL). It was played on June 29, 2013, at the Sioux Falls Arena in Sioux Falls, South Dakota. The top seed in the United Conference, the Sioux Falls Storm, defeated the top seed in the Intense Conference—the Nebraska Danger—by a score of 43–40.

Road to the United Bowl

2013 Indoor Football League season
United Bowl
2013 in sports in South Dakota
Nebraska Danger
Sioux Falls Storm
Sports competitions in South Dakota
June 2013 sports events in the United States